Yevgeny Kafelnikov and Daniel Vacek were the defending champions but did not compete that year.

Ellis Ferreira and Patrick Galbraith won in the final 6–3, 6–4 against Marc-Kevin Goellner and David Prinosil.

Seeds

  Ellis Ferreira /  Patrick Galbraith (champions)
  Luis Lobo /  Javier Sánchez (first round)
 # David Adams /  Andrei Olhovskiy (first round)
  Donald Johnson /  Francisco Montana (first round)

Draw

External links
 1997 CA-TennisTrophy Doubles draw

Doubles